Anton Marian August Hammerbacher (22 July 1871, in Munich – 22 October 1956, in Erlangen) was a German politician (SPD) and mayor of Erlangen from 1945 to 1946.

Mayor of Erlangen 
On 28 April 1945 Hammerbacher was appointed mayor of Erlangen by the military administration. He resigned on 30 September 1946.

His successor was Michael Poeschke.

Honors 
At the end of his term, the township of Erlangen awarded him with the honorary citizenship being followed with the Order of Merit of the Federal Republic of Germany in 1953. A street in Erlangen was given his name in 1960.

Literature 
 Haus der Bayerischen Geschichte: Geschichte des Bayerischen Parliaments 1819 – 2003
 Schweigert, Walter/Treuheit, Klaus (Hrsg.): ...daß der Mensch dem Menschen ein Helfer ist. 120 Jahre Sozialdemokratie in Erlangen. Erlangen 1990.
 Christoph Friederich: . In: Christoph Friederich, Bertold Freiherr von Haller, Andreas Jakob (Hrsg.): . W. Tümmels Verlag, Nürnberg 2002, .
 Gertraud Lehmann: . In: Christoph Friederich, Bertold Freiherr von Haller, Andreas Jakob (Hrsg.): . W. Tümmels Verlag, Nürnberg 2002, .
 Andreas Jakob: . In: Christoph Friederich, Bertold Freiherr von Haller, Andreas Jakob (Hrsg.): . W. Tümmels Verlag, Nürnberg 2002, .

References

1871 births
1956 deaths
Social Democratic Party of Germany politicians
Mayors of places in Bavaria
Recipients of the Cross of the Order of Merit of the Federal Republic of Germany
Mayors of Erlangen